Cernusco may refer to 2 Italian municipalities in Lombardy:

Cernusco Lombardone, in the province of Lecco
Cernusco sul Naviglio, in the province of Milan